The National Joint Apprenticeship and Training Committee (NJATC) is the former name for the Electrical Training Alliance, a nonprofit organization created in 1941 by the International Brotherhood of Electrical Workers (IBEW) and the National Electrical Contractors Association (NECA).

The NJATC was committed to developing and standardizing education in the electrical industry to properly and effectively train members of NECA and the IBEW, providing the electrical construction industry with the most highly trained and highly skilled workforce possible. The organization worked with subject matter experts, industry leaders, and various manufacturers to ensure that electrical apprentices in the organized labor movement had access to the most-up-to date training initiatives in the electrical construction industry.

The organization was known for hosting the National Training Institute (NTI), the largest electrical training seminar in North America. Nearly 2,000 electrical workers attend this event to learn about new industry trends, to see new products, and to attend in-depth training seminars. NTI is also home to one of the largest electrical trade shows in the construction industry.

As of 2007, there were more than 40,000 electrical apprentices enrolled in JATC programs throughout the United States and Canada. Since its inception, more than 325,000 electrical apprentices have completed NJATC training programs and become competent journeymen, making the organization one of the largest electrical training and apprenticeship programs of its kind.

Overview

Across the United States and Canada more than 200 local Joint Apprenticeship and Training Committees (JATCs) used the NJATC’s curricula to help train electrical apprentices. The NJATC developed electrical training curricula for Inside Wireman, Outside Lineman, Voice-Data-Video (VDV), and Residential Wireman programs. Emerging technologies such as photovoltaics (solar), wind power generation and programmable logic controllers (PLCs) are also encompassed in the NJATC curricula, along with codes and safety and instrumentation training. The organization is also responsible for spearheading a variety of electrical industry certifications such as cable splicing and conduit bending.

Its “Earn While You Learn” initiative allowed electrical apprentices to work and earn living wages while receiving related instructional training. This program also allowed JATC electrical apprenticeship programs to operate without the financial support of taxpayers. With the help of the American Council on Education, the NJATC has also developed a program that allows electrical apprentices to translate their instructional training into college credit. Depending on the area of study pursued, electrical apprentices could transfer up to 60 college credit hours from their electrical apprenticeship to colleges, universities, or community colleges.

References

External links
NJATC website
NECA website
IBEW website

Electrical trades organizations
Vocational education in the United States
Educational institutions established in 1941
Internships
International Brotherhood of Electrical Workers
Apprenticeship
1941 establishments in the United States